The women's +67 kg  competition in taekwondo at the 2004 Summer Olympics in Athens took place on August 29 at the Faliro Coastal Zone Olympic Complex.

China's Chen Zhong capped off the final day of the Games with a perfect culmination for her national squad, as she defended her Olympic title from Sydney in the women's heavyweight division over France's Myriam Baverel with a satisfying 12–5 record. Returning to her second Olympic stint along with Chen and Baverel, Venezuela's Adriana Carmona thrashed her Brazilian opponent Natália Falavigna 7–4 to pick up a bronze.

Competition format
The main bracket consisted of a single elimination tournament, culminating in the gold medal match. The taekwondo fighters eliminated in earlier rounds by the two finalists of the main bracket advanced directly to the repechage tournament. These matches determined the bronze medal winner for the event.

Schedule
All times are Greece Standard Time (UTC+2)

Results
Legend
PTG — Won by points gap
KO — Won by knockout
SUP — Won by superiority
OT — Won on over time (Golden Point)
WO — Walkover

Main bracket

Repechage

References

External links
Official Report

Women's 67 kg
Olymp
Women's events at the 2004 Summer Olympics